HBSS may refer to:

 Hanks' Balanced Salt Solution, a saline solution used to keep the osmotic pressure and pH in cells
 Host Based Security System, software applications used within the United States Department of Defense to monitor, detect and counterattacks against the Department of Defense computer networks and systems.